7 is an EP by the Irish rock band U2, released exclusively at Target retailers in the United States in 2002. It collects various B-sides from All That You Can't Leave Behind-era singles, which were previously unavailable in the US. The title refers to the number of tracks. Likewise, at the time of its release, 7 was priced at nearly seven US dollars. The title is also a homage to Three, the group's first release.

Release
7 was released at all 1,055 Target stores in the US on 22 January 2002. Its original retail price was US$6.99.

Track listing

"Always" is an early version of "Beautiful Day". "Big Girls Are Best" was a leftover from the Pop sessions.  This Influx mix of "Elevation" was used to open shows on the Elevation Tour. The single version of "Walk On", which was released on the single with the blue cover, was also featured in concerts, while a live version was released on America: A Tribute to Heroes. In 2002 another mix of "Walk On" called the "Hallelujah mix" (for its coda of hallelujahs) was released on a promotional CD.

Personnel
Bono – lead vocals
The Edge – guitar, keyboards, vocals
Adam Clayton – bass guitar
Larry Mullen Jr. – drums
Daniel Lanois, Brian Eno – production (on all tracks except "Big Girls Are Best" and "Stuck in a Moment You Can't Get Out Of")
Howie B, Flood – production (on "Big Girls Are Best")
Steve Lillywhite – production (on "Stuck in a Moment You Can't Get Out Of")
Nigel Godrich – additional production (on "Walk On")

See also
U2 discography

References

2002 EPs
Seven
2002 compilation albums
U2 compilation albums
B-side compilation albums
Interscope Records compilation albums
Interscope Records EPs
Albums produced by Daniel Lanois
Albums produced by Brian Eno
Albums produced by Nigel Godrich
Albums produced by Howie B
Albums produced by Flood (producer)
Albums produced by Steve Lillywhite